The 1966 BC Lions finished in fifth place in the Western Conference with a 5–11 record continuing to regress as their star players were in the twilights of their careers.

The Lions lost many close games, including five by one or two points.  Placekicker Bill Mitchell kicked a woeful 11 for 25 field goal attempts.

After the season, Joe Kapp was traded to the Minnesota Vikings of the NFL and in return the Lions got a young Canadian receiver, Jim Young.  A number of former stars retired, including standouts Willie Fleming and Tom Hinton.

The first gooseneck or slingshot field goal post was installed at Empire Stadium for the 1966 Grey Cup game.

Regular season

Season standings

Season schedule

Offensive leaders

Awards and records

1966 CFL All-Stars
None

References

BC Lions seasons
BC Lions
1966 Canadian Football League season by team